Michaela Schaffrath ( Jänke; born 6 December 1970) is a German television actress and former pornographic actress. 

A former nurse, she got started in the adult film industry after she posed nude for Coupé, a German adult magazine. She gained international notoriety during her career as a pornographic actress under the stage name Gina Wild. She won two Venus Awards, for Best New Starlet in 1999 and Best German Actress in 2000.

In 2001, Schaffrath retired from pornography and moved into mainstream acting, and has since appeared in numerous German television series, such as TV total, In aller Freundschaft, and Wer wird Millionär?. After being recognized by a fan, she admitted in 2003 that she was working in a Frankfurt brothel, but stated it was because she was addicted to sex, rather than to make money. In 2005, she put the rights to her stage name and the brand 'Gina Wild' up for sale, in an attempt to shed her porn star past. 

She is managed by her former husband, and as of 2009, lived in both Frankfurt and Hamburg.

References

External links

 
 
 
 
 

1970 births
German pornographic film actresses
Living people
People from Eschweiler
Ich bin ein Star – Holt mich hier raus! participants
German women nurses